Litherland is a Metropolitan Borough of Sefton ward in the Bootle Parliamentary constituency that covers the southern part of the locality of Litherland. The ward population taken at the 2011 census was 11,231.

Councillors

Election results

Elections of the 2010s

References

Wards of the Metropolitan Borough of Sefton